In the mathematical area of bifurcation theory a saddle-node bifurcation, tangential bifurcation or fold bifurcation is a local bifurcation in which two fixed points (or equilibria) of a dynamical system collide and annihilate each other. The term 'saddle-node bifurcation' is most often used in reference to continuous dynamical systems. In discrete dynamical systems, the same bifurcation is often instead called a fold bifurcation.  Another name is blue sky bifurcation in reference to the sudden creation of two fixed points.

If the phase space is one-dimensional, one of the equilibrium points is unstable (the saddle), while the other is stable (the node).

Saddle-node bifurcations may be associated with hysteresis loops and catastrophes.

Normal form

A typical example of a differential equation with a saddle-node bifurcation is:

At  (the bifurcation point) there is exactly one equilibrium point. At this point the fixed point is no longer hyperbolic. In this case the fixed point is called a saddle-node fixed point.
If  there are no equilibrium points.

In fact, this is a normal form of a saddle-node bifurcation. The first condition is the nondegeneracy condition and the second condition is the transversality condition.

Example in two dimensions

An example of a saddle-node bifurcation in two dimensions occurs in the two-dimensional dynamical system:

As can be seen by the animation obtained by plotting phase portraits by varying the parameter ,
 When  is negative, there are no equilibrium points.
 When , there is a saddle-node point.
 When  is positive, there are two equilibrium points: that is, one saddle point and one node (either an attractor or a repellor).

Other examples are in modelling biological switches. Recently, it was shown that under certain conditions, the Einstein field equations of General Relativity have the same form as a fold bifurcation. A non-autonomous version of the saddle-node bifurcation (i.e. the parameter is time-dependent) has also been studied.

See also
Pitchfork bifurcation
Transcritical bifurcation
Hopf bifurcation
Saddle point

Notes

References
 
 
 
 
 

Bifurcation theory
Articles containing video clips